The Stratford School of Interaction Design and Business, also known as the University of Waterloo Stratford School and formerly the University of Waterloo Stratford Campus, is a satellite campus of the University of Waterloo located in Stratford, Ontario, Canada.

Founded in June 2009, the University of Waterloo Stratford School is part of the Faculty of Arts, established to provide programs that focus on digital media, interaction design, digital technologies, content creation and user experience within a business context.

History

On 16 October 2006, the city council of the City of Stratford authorized Mayor Dan Mathieson to sign a memorandum of agreement with the Stratford Festival and the University of Waterloo to explore the possibility of having a liberal arts college located in Stratford.

The Province of Ontario granted $10 million to the University of Waterloo Stratford Stratford Campus on 26 March 2008. The following day, Waterloo-based enterprise software company OpenText announced that they had committed $10 million to the project.

On 22 January 2009, the federal government announced that it was pledging $10.7 million over five years for the Corridor for Advancing Canadian Digital Media - now known as the Canadian Digital Media initiative under the Canadian Digital Media Network (CDMN) – a joint initiative between Communitech and University of Waterloo Stratford Campus. In June of the same year, the first ever Canada 3.0 forum in Stratford, ON was hosted by the University of Waterloo Stratford Campus and CDMN. The event was the official launch of the University of Waterloo Stratford Campus.

The official opening of the campus took place on 20 September 2010 at its temporary location at 6 Wellington St., Stratford, Ontario. The first class of the Master of Digital Experience Innovation (MDEI) – an interdisciplinary, professional one-year program - began at the temporary campus the following year.

On 1 August 2011, Dr. Christine McWebb, Professor in the Department of French Studies, UW becomes the Director, Academic Programs and on 1 October 2011, Ginny Dybenko, the former Dean of the Wilfrid Laurier School of Business & Economics, becomes the Executive Director of the University of Waterloo Stratford Campus.

In January 2012, a part-time Master of Digital Experience Innovation option was added. The program integrated a Project Management Professional certification component into the curriculum for all students.
 
The first class of the Honors Bachelor of Global Business and Digital Arts program began their studies on 5 September 2012 at the new campus located at 125 St. Patrick St. On 16 October 2012 the building was officially unveiled to the community.

On 15 November 2013 it was announced that University of Waterloo Stratford Campus would receive approximately $1.75 million in federal funding to strengthen the Stratford Accelerator Centre over the next five years. The centre provides mentorship and coaching for tech-related startups, including those launched by University of Waterloo Stratford Campus faculty and students. Stratford Accelerator Centre relocated to University of Waterloo Stratford Campus in spring 2014.

On 1 July 2018, the University of Waterloo Stratford Campus became the Faculty of Arts' newest school, with its new name "Stratford School of Interaction Design and Business". The designation of school enabled the School to hire its own full-time faculty members, develop its own research and academic programming.

Stratford School
The University of Waterloo Stratford School of Interaction Design and Business is located at 125 St. Patrick Street. The building is a three-storey, 42,000 square-foot space that features digital media labs, user research labs, sound suites, project rooms, open-concept collaboration spaces and software for design, interaction design, photography, video production, app development and web development.

Christie MicroTiles Wall
Located in the centre of the University of Waterloo Stratford School of Interaction Design and Business is its Christie MicroTiles wall which is the tallest display of its kind in the world. It is three-storeys high, with 150 MicroTiles that can reproduce 115 percent of the NTSC colour gamut, exceeding typical LCD flat panels by more than 50 percent. The wall is used to showcase student content, highlight creative accomplishments and provide an open source canvas for digital media research.

The University of Waterloo Stratford School's Christie MicroTile wall was the Gold Winner in the Education and Healthcare category of the 2013 Apex Awards.

Engage: UX + Gamification Research Lab

Located in the University of Waterloo Stratford School, it is used by students and faculty for research, experimentation, prototype development and commercialization as it pertains to UX and gamification.

Stratford Accelerator Centre

was located at the University of Waterloo Stratford School, beginning in 2014, the Stratford Accelerator Centre focuses on accelerating the growth and maturation of early-stage technology and digital media companies. The Accelerator Centre further provides mentorship to undergraduate and graduate students on campus

Administration
Christine McWebb is the Director of the University of Waterloo Stratford School of Interaction Design and Business.

The University of Waterloo Stratford School operates under the same bicameral system as the University of Waterloo; a system that consists of a Board of Governors and a Senate, as legislated by the University of Waterloo Act, 1972. The School shares the same President and Chancellor as the University of Waterloo.

The Office of the Chancellor is currently held by Dominic Barton, global managing partner of McKinsey & Company. In March 2011, Feridun Hamdullahpur was announced as the sixth President of the university, having been interim president since October 2010.

Academics and Programs

The University of Waterloo Stratford School prepares students for careers in the area of digital media and design. Students are brought together with faculty, researchers, cultural organizations, business and entrepreneurs through coursework and project-based learning.

Master of Digital Experience Innovation (MDEI)

Offered at the University of Waterloo Stratford School, this programme began in fall 2011.  It is made up of both recent university graduates and working professionals that want to expand their skills. MDEI is a professional degree that offers project-based learning and a multidisciplinary set of courses, complete with the education portion of the Project Management Professional certification. The MDEI is offered on a full-time or part-time basis. The full-time program occurs over three consecutive terms: fall, winter and spring, while part-time students take two courses per term over 24 months, with a final project in the last spring term of their program.

Honors Bachelor of Global Business and Digital Arts (GBDA)

The Global Business and Digital Arts programme began in the fall of 2012. It is unique to the Stratford School of Interaction Design and Business. Students are involved in hands-on projects with industry partners and have access to the latest digital technologies. In addition, they complete a paid practicum and are able to earn the educational hours to qualify for the Certificate in Associated Project Management accreditation. On 21 June 2018, Canadian Design Firm Rossul had named the Stratford School of Interaction Design and Business "Best Canadian Undergraduate UX Design University".

Housing

Students live off-campus in the Stratford community. The University of Waterloo Off-Campus Housing Office does not provide resources to students.

Activities and Events

Canada 3.0

In 2008, the inaugural Canada 3.0 conference was hosted by the University of Waterloo Stratford School in Stratford, Ontario with over 1,500 attendees discussing how to make Canada a world leader in the digital economy.

Discovering Digital Media Days
Discovering Digital Media Days is an annual program that delivers interactive programming for high school students who aspire to be leaders in Canada's growing digital economy. Students interact with industry experts, develop their own digital designs, build business skills and discover the creative and commercial potential for digital media.

Gamification 2013
Gamification 2013 was hosted by University of Waterloo Stratford School and entertainment. There were academic research presentations, talks on gamification implementation and commercialization, workshops, and demonstrations of successful gamification initiatives in the areas of health care, marketing, education, and entertainment.

uXperience Design Camp
Taking place from 16 to 17 November 2013,  Design Camp was an experiential User Experience (UX) bootcamp that focused on creating viable solutions to real life problems utilizing the principles of user experience (UX) design.

Software developers, engineers, computer scientists, psychologists, designers, UX professionals and students took advantage of the experience of mentors and usability testers to acquire the knowledge they needed to pitch their demos to a panel of judges. The winning idea was given support for commercialization.

CODE
The Stratford School was a host site for the Canadian Open Data Experience (CODE) Hackathon from 28 February – 2 March 2014. It was where participants from across Canada turned federal Open Data into interesting and beneficial applications.

The University of Waterloo Stratford School hosted Inspiration Day with an information session on the use of Big Data and the power of combining it with Data Visualization.

Accelerator Centre Lunch and Learn Programs
The Accelerator Centre located at the University of Waterloo Stratford School provides lunch and learn sessions on relevant topics such as networking, how to secure funding for your business and public relations.

SOCDOCS
The  University of Waterloo Stratford School is a partner of SOCDOCS, a film documentary festival that offers teachers and students a creative opportunity to make visual and audio statements through the digital vehicle of choice on social justice issues such as poverty, war, homelessness, environment, sex discrimination, addiction, slavery, or prejudice.

ESQ Camps

Throughout the summer, University of Waterloo Stratford School camps teams visit communities to engage kids in hands-on engineering and science activities. The camps have won a national award for engineering and science outreach.

External links

 Official website
 Stratford Accelerator Centre website
 University of Waterloo website
 Canadian Digital Media Network website

References

Educational institutions established in 2009
Stratford
Education in Stratford, Ontario
Digital media education
2009 establishments in Ontario
University of Waterloo Stratford